The Abbotsford Rugby Football Club is a Canadian rugby union club based in Abbotsford, British Columbia.
The Abbotsford RFC was founded in 1972. The top men's side currently plays in the British Columbia Men's Division 1 League, the second tier of the British Columbia Rugby Union.

History

The Abbotsford RFC was established in 1972 and began play in the Vancouver Rugby Union for their inaugural season. The following year the club would join the newly established Fraser Valley Rugby Union.

The club has steadily been building a name for itself in British Columbia rugby becoming more and more competitive each year, however, they have yet to capture a British Columbia Premiership title. Abbotsford RFC was relegated to BC League One for the 2012/2013 season after finishing 8th in the 2011/12 BC Premier League season.

Facilities

The Abbotsford RFC play their home games at CFV Exhibition Park.

Titles

Rounsefell Cup: 0

Notable players

The following players have played for Abbotsford RFC at some point in their rugby careers and have achieved notability through representation at the international level and/or have gone on to play rugby professionally at a high level.

External links
Official Website
Twitter
Instagram
Facebook

Rugby union teams in British Columbia
Sport in Abbotsford, British Columbia
1972 establishments in British Columbia
Rugby clubs established in 1972

fr:British Columbia Rugby Union